"The Red Shoes" is a song written and performed by English musician Kate Bush. It was the fourth single released from her seventh studio album, The Red Shoes (1993). The single was released in April 1994 and reached number 21 on the UK Singles Chart.

Background and content

The song is about a girl who puts on a pair of enchanted ballet slippers and can't stop dancing until she breaks the spell. It is inspired by a character in the Michael Powell and Emeric Pressburger film The Red Shoes.

Release
"The Red Shoes" was released on 7-inch vinyl, cassette, and CD on 5 April 1994. "You Want Alchemy" is the B-side song on all formats except the second part of the CD single. The second part of the CD single was released six days after the first part and features a 10-minute remix by Karl Blagan of "The Red Shoes", renamed "Shoedance", as well as remixes of "The Big Sky" and "Running Up That Hill".

Critical reception
Parry Gettelman from Orlando Sentinel wrote, "The mandola, the whistles and various curious instruments on the driving title track really recall the fever-dream quality of the 1948 ballet film The Red Shoes, the album's namesake."

Track listings
All songs were written by Kate Bush.

7-inch and cassette single

CD1

CD2

Personnel
 Kate Bush – lead and backing vocals, keyboards
 Paddy Bush – mandola, tin whistle, musical bow, backing vocals
 Del Palmer – Fairlight CMI programming
 Danny McIntosh – guitar
 Gaumont d'Olivera – bass guitar
 Stuart Elliott – drums, percussion
 Colin Lloyd Tucker – backing vocals

Charts

References

Kate Bush songs
1993 songs
1994 singles
EMI Records singles
Songs about dancing
Songs written by Kate Bush
Music based on works by Hans Christian Andersen
Works based on The Red Shoes (fairy tale)